Lake Krasnoye (literally “Red Lake”) may refer to:

 Lake Krasnoye (Leningrad Oblast), a lake in the central part of the Karelian Isthmus, in Leningrad Oblast, Russia
 Lake Krasnoye (Chukotka), a lake in Chukotka Autonomous Okrug, Russia

See also 
 Lake Gołdap, a lake divided between Poland's Gołdap County and Russia's Kaliningrad Oblast, which is also named “Krasnoye” in Russian

ru:Красное#Озёра